In reptiles, the nasal scale refers to the scale that encloses the nostril.

Sometimes this scale is paired (divided). In such cases, the anterior half is referred to as the prenasal and the posterior half is referred to as the postnasal.

Supranasal scales are located above the nasal scale.

See also
 Snake scales
 Anatomical terms of location
 Nasal (disambiguation)

References

Snake scales